The Australian Red Cross, formally the Australian Red Cross Society, is a humanitarian aid and community services charity in Australia. Tracing its history back to 1923 and being incorporated by royal charter in 1941, the Australian Red Cross Society is the national member of the Federation of Red Cross and Red Crescent Societies and part of the International Red Cross Movement. The Australian Red Cross is guided by the Fundamental Principles of the International Red Cross and Red Crescent Movement and as such is a non-religious, neutral, impartial and independent humanitarian organisation.

The Australian Red Cross provides a range of services and programmes including international aid across the Asia-Pacific region, international humanitarian law advocacy, migration support, emergency management, blood donation via Australian Red Cross Lifeblood, and community services for Aboriginal and Torres Strait Islander peoples, youth, families, the elderly, and persons with disabilities.

David Hurley, governor-general of Australia, is the patron of the Australian Red Cross and a non-voting member of the Council of the Society of Australian Red Cross. The Council is the peak governance decision-making body and is made up of the Red Cross Board, up to six special councillors, and 32 members appointed by Divisional Advisory Boards.

History
A branch of the British Red Cross was established in Australia in 1914, nine days after the start of World War I, by Lady Helen Munro Ferguson. The British Red Cross Australian Branch changed its name to the Australian Red Cross Society and was incorporated by royal charter on 28 June 1941.

The organisation grew at a rapid rate. Lady Helen wrote to the mayors of every shire and municipality in Australia asking them to initiate a local branch.  Typically, a letter was published in the local newspaper and a meeting called. By November 1914, New South Wales had 88 city or suburban branches and 249 country branches, all established within the previous four months. The Society was accepted by the community from the beginning. Much of the World War I home front activities such as knitting socks and rolling bandages were done by local Red Cross branches.  The Red Cross Information Bureau was established in 1915 in order to coordinate information gathered on the dead and their burial beyond what was provided by the armed forces.  The Red Cross Wounded and Missing files were extensive with searchers sometimes sent overseas to clarify information, make better judgements and resolve conflicting accounts. In 1916 the Australian Red Cross Society sent a team of 21 civilian nurses to France; these nurses were dubbed the "Bluebirds" in reference to the colours of their specially-designed uniforms.

During World War II the Red Cross provided assistance to the sick, wounded, maimed and their dependents. By agreement with the federal government they provided hostel accommodation to those with no living relatives or friends to support them upon returning home from war. At the time the majority of the volunteers were unemployed married women.  High rates of membership in the organisation were attributed to their annual, national, recruitment drive. Membership grew from 260,000 in 1941 to 450,000 in 1944. The Australian Red Cross proved to be an important link between the public and Japanese prisoners of war.

From the establishment of the Repatriation Commission Outpatient Clinic at 310 St Kilda Rd, Southbank, in 1937 the Red Cross maintained the canteen staffed by up to 25 volunteers. The canteen provided tea, coffee, biscuits and company for between 200 and 250 veterans each day waiting their appointments.

In 2005, the organisation made an agreement with the Maldives Government to help clear debris created by the 2004 Indian Ocean earthquake and tsunami. In December 2010, aid workers from the Australian Red Cross were sent to Christmas Island to assist the survivors of the 2010 Christmas Island boat disaster. Australian Red Cross volunteers were also active after Cyclone Tracy hit Darwin, the Ash Wednesday bushfires, the Black Saturday bushfires and the 2010–11 Queensland floods.

In 2013, the Australian Red Cross was a recipient of the Queensland Greats Awards.

Volunteers
All Australian Red Cross programs are primarily run, organised, and managed by volunteers with oversight from Red Cross employees. Volunteers are organised into three different groups, responding to different needs:
 community volunteering - support for homelessness, mental health, migration, youth, family, elderly, Aboriginal and Torres Strait Islander peoples, and people in the justice system support.
 emergency services - urgent-response programs, such as psychological first aid for those in evacuation centres, door-to-door support following a flood or bushfire, or registering missing persons after disasters on their Register.Find.Reunite platform.
 retail, customer service, and administration - volunteering at Australian Red Cross Shops (which help fund services), the Melbourne Supporter Services Centre, or in organisational positions like human resources, finance, or legal.

Red Cross statistics show that 2.5 million people have, in some form, volunteered with the Australian Red Cross since its inception.

Priorities
The eight priority areas of Red Cross are:
 Strengthening national emergency preparedness, response and recovery
 Increasing international aid and development
 Strengthening communities in areas of locational disadvantage
 Championing international humanitarian law ("the laws of war")
 Addressing the impact of migration
 Partnering with Aboriginal and Torres Strait Islander peoples
 Overcoming social exclusion by providing bridges back into the community
 Provide a safe, secure supply of blood and blood products - through Australian Red Cross Lifeblood

See also
 Hematologist Lucy Meredith Bryce was the founding director from 1929 to 1954 (then named the Victoria Red Cross Blood Transfusion Service)
 Alice Creswick, Principal Commandant (1940–1946)
 Red Cross House, Sydney

References

External links

 

Red Cross and Red Crescent national societies
Medical and health organisations based in Australia
1914 establishments in Australia
Organizations established in 1914
Organisations based in Melbourne
Emergency medical services in Australia
Queensland Greats